St. Clair County is the ninth most populous county in Illinois, located in the southwestern part of the state along the Mississippi River bordering Missouri. Located directly east of St. Louis, the county is part of the Metro East region of the Greater St. Louis metropolitan area. As of the 2020 United States census, St. Clair County had a population of 257,400, making it the third most populous county in Illinois outside the Chicago metropolitan area. Belleville is the county’s seat and largest city. 

Cahokia Village was founded in 1697 by French settlers and served as a Jesuit mission to convert tribes of the Illinois Confederation to Christianity. Prior to the establishment of Illinois as a state, the government of the Northwest Territory created St. Clair County in 1790 out of the western half of Knox County. In 1809, the county became the administrative center of the Illinois Territory and one of the two original counties of Illinois, alongside Randolph County.

In 1970, the United States Census Bureau placed the mean center of U.S. population in St. Clair County.

History
This area was occupied for thousands of years by cultures of indigenous peoples. The first modern explorers and colonists of the area were French and French Canadians, founding a mission settlement in 1697 now known as Cahokia Village. After Great Britain defeated France in the Seven Years' War in 1763 and absorbed its territory in North America east of the Mississippi River, British-American colonists began to move into the area. Many French Catholics moved to settlements west of the river rather than live under British Protestant rule.

After the United States achieved independence in the late 18th century, St. Clair County was the first county established in present-day Illinois; it antedates Illinois' existence as a separate jurisdiction. The county was established in 1790 by a proclamation of Arthur St. Clair, first governor of the Northwest Territory, who named it after himself.

The original boundary of St. Clair county covered a large area between the Mackinaw and Ohio rivers. In 1801, Governor William Henry Harrison re-established St. Clair County as part of the Indiana Territory, extending its northern border to Lake Superior and the international border with Rupert's Land.

When the Illinois Territory was created in 1809, Territorial Secretary Nathaniel Pope, in his capacity as acting governor, issued a proclamation establishing St. Clair and Randolph County as the two original counties of Illinois.

Originally developed for agriculture, this area became industrialized and urbanized in the area of East St. Louis, Illinois, a city that developed on the east side of the Mississippi River from St. Louis, Missouri. It was always strongly influenced by actions of businessmen from St. Louis, who were initially French Creole fur traders with western trading networks.

In the 19th century, industrialists from St. Louis put coal plants and other heavy industry on the east side of the river, developing East St. Louis. Coal from southern mines was transported on the river to East St. Louis, then fed by barge to St. Louis furnaces as needed. After bridges spanned the river, industry expanded.

In the late 19th and early 20th centuries, the cities attracted immigrants from southern and eastern Europe and from the South. In 1910 there were 6,000 African Americans in the city. With the Great Migration underway from the rural South, to leave behind Jim Crow and disenfranchisement, by 1917, the African-American population in East St. Louis had doubled. Whites were generally hired first and given higher–paying jobs, but there were still opportunities for American blacks. If hired as strikebreakers, they were resented by white workers, and both groups competed for jobs and limited housing in East St. Louis. The city had not been able to keep up with the rapid growth of population. The United States was developing war industries to support its eventual entry into the Great War, now known as World War I.

In February 1917 tensions in the city arose as white workers struck at the Aluminum Ore Company. Employers fiercely resisted union organizing, sometimes with violence. In this case they hired hundreds of blacks as strikebreakers. White workers complained to the city council about this practice in late May. Rumors circulated about an armed African American man robbing a white man, and whites began to attack blacks on the street. The governor ordered in the National Guard and peace seemed restored by early June.

"On July 1, a white man in a Ford shot into black homes. Armed African-Americans gathered in the area and shot into another oncoming Ford, killing two men who turned out to be police officers investigating the shooting." Word spread and whites gathered at the Labor Temple; the next day they fanned out across the city, armed with guns, clubs, anything they could use against the blacks they encountered. From July 1 through July 3, 1917, the East St. Louis riots engulfed the city, with whites attacking blacks throughout the city, pulling them from streetcars, shooting and hanging them, burning their houses. During this period, some African Americans tried to swim or use boats to get to safety; thousands crossed the Eads Bridge to St. Louis, seeking refuge, until the police closed it off. The official death toll was 39 blacks and nine whites, but some historians believe more blacks were killed. Because the riots were racial terrorism, the Equal Justice Initiative has included these deaths among the lynchings of African Americans in the state of Illinois in its 2017 3rd edition of its report, Lynching in America.

The riots had disrupted East St. Louis, which had seemed to be on the rise as a flourishing industrial city. In addition to the human toll, they cost approximately $400,000 in property damage (over $8 million, in 2017 US Dollars ). They have been described as among the worst labor and race-related riots in United States history, and they devastated the African-American community.

Rebuilding was difficult as workers were being drafted to fight in World War I. When the veterans returned, they struggled to find jobs and re-enter the economy, which had to shift down to peacetime.

In the late 20th century, national restructuring of heavy industry cost many jobs, hollowing out the city, which had a marked decline in population. Residents who did not leave have suffered high rates of poverty and crime. In the early 21st century, East St. Louis is a site of urban decay. Swathes of deteriorated housing were demolished and parts of the city have become urban prairie. In 2017 the city marked the centennial of the riots that had so affected its residents.

Other cities in St. Clair County border agricultural or vacant lands. Unlike the suburbs on the Missouri side of the metro area, those in Metro-East are typically separated by agriculture, or otherwise undeveloped land left after the decline of industry. The central portion of St. Clair county is located on a bluff along the Mississippi River. This area is being developed with suburban housing, particularly in Belleville, and its satellite cities. The eastern and southern portion of the county is sparsely populated. The older small communities and small tracts of newer suburban villages are located between large areas of land devoted to corn and soybean fields, the major commodity crops of the area.

According to the St. Clair County Historical Society, the county flag was designed in 1979 by Kent Zimmerman, a senior at O'Fallon Township High School. Zimmerman's flag won first place in a contest against submissions by more than 40 grade school and high school students from throughout the county. The winning entry features the outline of St. Clair County with an orange moon, a stalk of corn, and a pickaxe against a background of three stripes alternating green, yellow, and green.

Geography

Climate and weather

Transportation

Major highways

  Interstate 55
  Interstate 64
  Interstate 70
  Interstate 255
  U.S. Highway 40
  U.S. Highway 50
  Illinois Route 3
  Illinois Route 4
  Illinois Route 13
  Illinois Route 15
  Illinois Route 111
  Illinois Route 156
  Illinois Route 157
  Illinois Route 158
  Illinois Route 159
  Illinois Route 161
  Illinois Route 163
  Illinois Route 177
  Illinois Route 203

Public transit

St. Clair County is home to 11 St. Louis MetroLink stations on the Red and Blue Lines.

 East Riverfront
 5th & Missouri
 Emerson Park
 Jackie Joyner-Kersee Center
 Washington Park
 Fairview Heights
 Memorial Hospital
 Swansea
 Belleville
 College
 Shiloh-Scott

St. Clair County is also served by Metrobus and Madison County Transit.

Adjacent counties and city

 Madison County (north)
 Clinton County (northeast)
 Washington County (east)
 Randolph County (south)
 Monroe County (southwest)
 St. Louis, Missouri (west)
 St. Louis County, Missouri (west)

Demographics

In the 2020 United States Census the racial makeup of the county was 59.6% White, 29.7% black or African American, 1.4% Asian, 0.3% American Indian, 0.1% Pacific islander, 2.1% from other races, and 6.8% from two or more races. 4.9% were of Hispanic or Latino origin. 

As of the 2010 United States Census, there were 270,056 people, 105,045 households, and 70,689 families residing in the county. The racial makeup of the county was 64.6% white, 30.5% black or African American, 1.2% Asian, 0.2% American Indian, 0.1% Pacific islander, 1.2% from other races, and 2.2% from two or more races. Those of Hispanic or Latino origin made up 3.3% of the population. In terms of ancestry, 27.5% were German, 11.1% were Irish, 7.4% were English, and 4.6% were American.

Of the 105,045 households, 34.7% had children under the age of 18 living with them, 44.6% were married couples living together, 17.7% had a female householder with no husband present, 32.7% were non-families, and 27.5% of all households were made up of individuals. The average household size was 2.53 and the average family size was 3.09. The median age was 36.9 years.

The median income for a household in the county was $48,562 and the median income for a family was $61,042. Males had a median income of $47,958 versus $34,774 for females. The per capita income for the county was $24,770. About 12.3% of families and 15.5% of the population were below the poverty line, including 24.7% of those under age 18 and 9.7% of those age 65 or over.

Government and infrastructure
The Southwestern Illinois Correctional Center, operated by the Illinois Department of Corrections, is near East St. Louis.

Also located in St. Clair County is Scott Air Force Base, which is home to U.S. Transportation Command, the Air Force's Air Mobility Command, and the Military Surface Deployment and Distribution Command.

Politics
St. Clair County is a reliably Democratic county, having voted for the Democratic presidential candidate in every presidential election since 1928, with the exception of the 1972 United States presidential election.

Communities

Cities

 Belleville
 Cahokia Heights
 Collinsville
 Columbia
 East St. Louis
 Fairview Heights
 Lebanon
 Madison
 Mascoutah
 O'Fallon

Villages

 Brooklyn
 Caseyville
 Dupo
 East Carondelet
 Fairmont City
 Fayetteville
 Freeburg
 Hecker
 Lenzburg
 Marissa
 Millstadt
 New Athens
 New Baden
 Sauget
 Shiloh
 Smithton
 St. Libory
 Summerfield
 Swansea
 Washington Park

Census-designated places

 Darmstadt
 Floraville
 Paderborn
 Rentchler
 Scott AFB

Unincorporated communities

 Douglas
 Imbs
 North Dupo
 Signal Hill
 State Park Place
 Westview

Townships

 Canteen
 Caseyville
 Centreville
 East St. Louis
 Engelmann
 Fayetteville
 Freeburg
 Lebanon
 Lenzburg
 Marissa
 Mascoutah
 Millstadt
 New Athens
 O'Fallon
 Prairie du Long
 St. Clair
 Shiloh Valley
 Smithton
 Stites
 Stookey
 Sugarloaf

Former Township
Belleville
Former Communities

 Alorton
 Cahokia
 Centreville
 National City

Islands

 Bloody Island

Education
Here is a list of school districts with any territory in the county, no matter how slight, even if the schools and/or administrative offices are located in other counties:
 K-12 school districts
 Brooklyn Community Unit School District 188
 Cahokia Community Unit School District 187
 Collinsville Community Unit School District 10
 Columbia Community Unit School District 4
 Dupo Community Unit School District 196
 East St. Louis School District 189
 Lebanon Community Unit School District 9
 Marissa Community Unit School District 40
 Mascoutah Community Unit School District 19
 New Athens Community Unit School District 60
 Red Bud Community Unit School District 132
 Waterloo Community Unit School District 5
 Wesclin Community Unit School District 3

 Secondary school districts
 Belleville Township High School District 201
 Freeburg Community High School District 77
 O'Fallon Township High School District 203

 Elementary school districts
 Belle Valley School District 11
 Belleville School District 118
 Central School District 104
 Harmony Emge School District 175
 Freeburg Community Consolidated School District 70
 Grant Community Consolidated School District 110
 High Mount School District 116
 Millstadt Consolidated Community School District 160
 O'Fallon Community Consolidated School District 90
 Pontiac-William Holliday School District 105
 Shiloh Village School District 85
 Signal Hill School District 181
 Smithton Community Consolidated School District 130
 St. Libory Consolidated School District 30
 Whiteside School District 115
 Wolf Branch School District 113

See also

 National Register of Historic Places listings in St. Clair County, Illinois

References

External links
 A Brief History of St. Clair County, Illinois from rootsweb.com
 St. Clair County Historical Society & Research Library

 
1790 establishments in the Northwest Territory
Illinois counties
Illinois counties on the Mississippi River
Southern Illinois
Metro East
Populated places established in 1790